Extè is an Italian fashion clothing brand introduced in 1996 by IT Holding Group.  The company sells youth ready-to-wear clothing and fashion accessories. Creative director for the brand has been held by: Antonio Berardi, Sergio Ciucci and Alessandro De Benedetti.

References

External links 

High fashion brands
Clothing brands of Italy
Clothing companies established in 1996